Norbert Casteret (19 August 1897 – 20 July 1987) was a famous French caver, adventurer and writer, and is one of the most recognisable names in caving worldwide. Following Édouard-Alfred Martel (the "father of modern speleology", although Casteret sometimes also enjoys this title), Casteret, along with Robert de Joly, became a leading figure of French speleology between the world wars and into the middle of the 20th century.

Biography 

Norbert Casteret was born in Saint-Martory in Haute-Garonne on 19 August 1897. His father, Henry Casteret, was a lawyer in Toulouse. His brothers were Roger, who died at the age of four, Jean and Martial Casteret, a physician who accompanied his brother on some of his explorations.

An all-round athlete and accomplished mountaineer, Casteret began caving in 1912, spanning the era of matches and candles into the age of electric lights. Unlike de Joly, who made caving his profession, Casteret was more the amateur adventurer (albeit a very knowledgeable one).

Casteret served in the French infantry for three years during World War I, serving in his brother Jean's regiment. After being demobilized in 1919, he contracted the Spanish flu. He kept the helmet and lamp he used in the trenches for future use in caving.

Upon his return from the front, at his father's urging Casteret studied law and became a notary's clerk, a position he quickly abandoned. In 1924, Casteret met his future wife, Élisabeth (born 13 May 1905), a doctor's daughter who ended her medical education after their marriage the same year. She later accompanied Casteret on many of his explorations, including the expedition to find the true source of the Garonne. The couple had five children: Gilberte, Raoul, Maud, Raymonde and Marie. Élisabeth died on 6 May 1940 of puerperal fever, a few days after the birth of their youngest child.

Casteret's motto was the Latin phrase Ad Augusta per Angusta (through difficulties to greatness).

Casteret died in Toulouse on 20 July 1987, less than a month before his ninetieth birthday.

Caving career 
Casteret's fame began with a bold free-dive in the Grotte de Montespan (French) in 1923, which led to the discovery of prehistoric cave drawings on the far side.

Casteret's popularity grew in the 1940s and 1950s, in part from his prolific writing – hundreds of articles, and more than 40 books with numerous reprintings in French and translations into several languages.

My Caves, translated from the French by R. L. G. Irving, was published in London by J.M. Dent & Sons in 1947, followed by The Darkness Under The Earth, in 1954.

See also 
 Grotte Casteret

Notes

References

External links 
 
 

1897 births
1987 deaths
French cavers
French explorers
French military personnel of World War I
French speleologists
Pyrénéistes
Sportspeople from Toulouse
20th-century French non-fiction writers
20th-century French male writers